"Dideba" ("Glory") was the national anthem of Georgia from November 1990 to May 2004. It was previously the national anthem of Georgia from 1918 to 1921.

History

Background
However, "Dideba"'s usage in this manner was to be short-lived. It would only be used for a few years, until Georgia came under Soviet rule from 1922 onward.

Readoption
Following the collapse of the Soviet Union in 1991, "Dideba" was readopted as the Georgian national anthem, though at the time of its re-adoption it was barely known by most Georgians as it had been almost seven decades since it was last used as the country's national anthem.

Replacement
"Dideba" was used as the Georgian national anthem from November 1990 until 20 May 2004, when it was replaced by the current Georgian national anthem "Tavisupleba" following the 2003 Rose Revolution. Though the replacement of "Dideba" came after a change in government, efforts to replace the song reportedly predated said reforms.

Lyrics

Notes

References

External links 
MIDI version
Video of a 2003 performance
Video of a 2004 performance
Video of a 2018 performance

Historical national anthems
National symbols of Georgia (country)
Georgian words and phrases
Georgian SSR
Georgian Soviet Socialist Republic
Music of Georgia (country)
Songs of Georgia (country)